Paratrytone is a genus of skippers in the family Hesperiidae.

Species
Recognised species in the genus Paratrytone include:
 Paratrytone aphractoia Dyar, 1914
 Paratrytone polyclea Godman, [1900]
 Paratrytone rhexenor Godman, [1900]
 Paratrytone samenta (Dyar, 1914)
 Paratrytone snowi Evans, [1955]

Former species
Paratrytone browni Bell, 1959 - transferred to Brownus browni (Bell, 1959)

References

Natural History Museum Lepidoptera genus database

Hesperiini
Hesperiidae genera